Courageous describes a person possessing courage. It may also refer to:

 Courageous (film), a Christian film by Sherwood pictures
 "Courageous" (song), a 2011 Casting Crowns song based on the film
 HMS Courageous, several ships of the Royal Navy
 RSS Courageous, a Fearless class patrol vessel
 USCGC Courageous (WMEC-622), a United States Coast Guard medium endurance cutter
 Courageous (yacht), a 12-metre class yacht

See also
 Albert III, Duke of Saxony (1443-1500), nicknamed "the Courageous"
 Courage (disambiguation)